James Hughes (November 24, 1823 – October 21, 1873) was a United States representative from Indiana and a judge of the Court of Claims.

Education and career

Born on November 24, 1823, in Bladensburg, Maryland, Hughes attended the common schools, Indiana University Bloomington, the United States Military Academy and read law in 1842. He was admitted to the bar and entered private practice in Bloomington and Bedford, Indiana from 1842 to 1852. He served as a lieutenant in the United States Army during the Mexican–American War. He was a judge of the Indiana Circuit Court for the Sixth Judicial Circuit from 1852 to 1856. He was Professor of law at Indiana University Bloomington from 1853 to 1856.

Congressional service

Hughes was elected as a Democrat from Indiana's 3rd congressional district to the United States House of Representatives of the 35th United States Congress, serving from March 4, 1857, to March 3, 1859. He was an unsuccessful candidate for reelection in 1858 to the 36th United States Congress.

Federal judicial service

Hughes was nominated by President James Buchanan on January 12, 1860, to a seat on the Court of Claims (later the United States Court of Claims) vacated by Judge Isaac Blackford. He was confirmed by the United States Senate on January 18, 1860, and received his commission the same day. His service terminated on December 1, 1864, due to his resignation.

Later career

Following his resignation from the federal bench, Hughes was a cotton agent for the United States Department of the Treasury from 1865 to 1866. He was a member of the Indiana House of Representatives from 1866 to 1868, and a member of the Indiana Senate from 1868 to 1869. He resumed private practice in Washington, D.C. from 1869 to 1873.

Death

Hughes died on October 21, 1873, in Bladensburg. He was interred in Rose Hill Cemetery in Bloomington.

Notes

References

Sources

 

1823 births
1873 deaths
People from Baltimore County, Maryland
People from Indiana in the Mexican–American War
Indiana state court judges
Democratic Party members of the Indiana House of Representatives
Judges of the United States Court of Claims
United States Article I federal judges appointed by James Buchanan
19th-century American judges
Democratic Party members of the United States House of Representatives from Indiana
19th-century American politicians
Burials in Indiana